Flos asoka  or Spangled Plushblue, is a butterfly in the family Lycaenidae. It was described by Lionel de Nicéville in 1884. It is found in the Indomalayan realm (Sikkim, Assam, Burma, Thailand - South China and Hong Kong).

References

External links
"Flos Doherty, 1889" at Markku Savela's Lepidoptera and Some Other Life Forms

Flos
Butterflies described in 1884